Venus Centre is a Syrian dubbing studio. Venus Centre specializes in dubbing animation and children's programs to the Arabic language, especially Japanese anime. The company is based in Damascus.

Tsurikichi Sanpei (Animation International) (1992–1994?)
Grimm's Fairy Tale Classics (Animation International) (1992)
Nadia: The Secret of Blue Water (Animation International) (1993-1994)
Naruto (Cartoon Star) (2007–2015)
Rock Lee & His Ninja Pals (Animation International) (2015)
Detective Conan (Animation International) (1998–present)
Detective Conan: The Time-Bombed Skyscraper (Animation International) (2008)
Detective Conan: The Fourteenth Target (Animation International) (2011)
Detective Conan: The Last Wizard of the Century (Animation International) (2011)
Detective Conan: Captured in Her Eyes (Animation International) (2011)
Dragon Ball (Animation International) (2002–2003)
Dragon Ball Z (Animation International) (2003–2004)
Dragon Ball Z Kai (Animation International) (2015–2016)
Captain Tsubasa (Starting with season 2 and the sequels) (Season 2: Young Future, J & Road to 2002: Animation International) (2005)
Slam Dunk (Animation International) (2000-2001?)
Jewelpet (Cartoon Star) (2011–2013)
Jewelpet Twinkle (Cartoon Star) (2013)
Kamikaze Kaitou Jeanne
One Piece (Cartoon Star) (2008–2010) (104 episodes only)
Mobile Suit Gundam Wing (Animation International) (2003)
The Pink Panther (Young Future (season 1) (2000) Cartoon Star (Season 2) (2006)
Dragon Booster (Eastern Vision S.A.) (2006)
Little Bear (Eastern Vision S.A.) (1998-1999)
The Bots Master
Foofur (Young Future Entertainment) (2001)
Bakugan Battle Brawlers (First 3 seasons only) (Seasons 1 & 2: Animation International, Season 3: Cartoon Star) (2009)
Pokémon (First 2 seasons only) (Animation International (current)) (2000–2001)
Anatole (Eastern Vision S.A.) (2004-2005?)
Hello Kitty's Paradise (Animation International) (2002-2003?)
Casper and the Angels (Young Future)
The Spooktacular New Adventures of Casper (Young Future Entertainment)
Casper's Scare School (Young Future Entertainment)
The Scooby-Doo Show (Young Future Entertainment)
Scooby-Doo! in Arabian Nights (Young Future Entertainment)
What's New, Scooby-Doo? (first dub) (Young Future Entertainment) (2005)
Little Monsters (Eastern Vision S.A.) (2003)
Tiny Toon Adventures (2003)
Baby Looney Tunes (2006)
The Road Runner Show (Young Future Entertainment) (2001-2002)
Taz-Mania (Young Future Entertainment) (2002)
ALF: The Animated Series (2003)
Fimbles (first dub) (Cartoon Star) (2006-2007?)
Franklin (Eastern Vision S.A.) (2004)
Franklin and Friends
The All-New Popeye Hour (Season 1: Tele–Pictures Promoters International (1995-1996), Season 2: Eastern Vision S.A.)
Popeye & Son (Eastern Vision S.A.) (2008)
Rupert (Eastern Vision S.A.) (2000-2001)
The Flintstones (Young Future Entertainment) (1997-1998)
The Jetsons
Bruno the Kid (Tele–Picturs Promoters Intrnantional) (1997-1998?)
Fabulous Funnies (Tele-Pictures Promoters International) (1996-1997?)
Camp Candy (Young Future Entertainment) (2002)
Police Academy: The Animated Series (Young Future Entertainment) (2002)
Hurricanes (Young Future Entertainment) (2002)
Make Way for Noddy Season 1: Young Future Entertainment (2003-2004) → Season 2: Young Future Entertainment (2006))
Bob the Builder (2015–2016)
Tommy & Oscar (first dub) (Young Future Entertainment) (2001)
Grander Musashi (Animation International)
Cyborg Kuro-chan (first dub) (Animation International) (2006)
Black Cat (Cartoon Star) (2009–2010)
The Mask: Animated Series (Young Future) (1999)
Batman (first dub) (Young Future Entertainment) (2000)
Krypto the Superdog (Cartoon Star) (2007)
Street Sharks (Tele–Pictures Promoters International) (1997)
Happy Ness: Secret of the Loch (Tele–Pictures Promoters International) (1996-1997)
Captain Simian & the Space Monkeys (Young Future Entertainment) (2001)
Stone Protectors (Tele Pictures (former), Young Future Entertainment (current))
Teenage Mutant Ninja Turtles (1987) (Tele Pictures Promoters International) (replacing Fimali Productions Sarl) (1995)
Teenage Mutant Ninja Turtles (2004)
¡Mucha Lucha! (first dub) (Young Future Entertainment) (2004)
Animaniacs (Young Future Entertainment) (2001)
Pinky and the Brain (Young Future Entertainment) (2001-2002)
Little Battlers Experience (Cartoon Star) (2015)
Monsuno (Cartoon Star) (2012–2014)
Inazuma Eleven (Animation International) (2010-2018)
Street Fighter (Young Future) (1998)
Mortal Kombat: Defenders of the Realm (Tele–Picturs Promoters Intrnantional) (1997)
ProStars (Young Future Entertainment) (2001)
Space Warrior Baldios (Animation International) (2006)
Adventures of Sonic the Hedgehog (Part 1: Tele–Pictures Promoters International (1996), Part 3: Cartoon Star)
Sonic the Hedgehog (Young Future Entertainment) (2004)
The Wacky World of Tex Avery (Cartoon Star) (2007)
The Twisted Tales of Felix the Cat (Tele–Picturs Promoters Intrnantional) (1997-1998)
Maya the Honey Bee (redub) (Animation International) (2002)
F (Cartoon Star) (2009)
Ranma ½ (Cartoon Star) (2011–2013)
Birdz (Eastern Vision S.A.) (2006)
Nontan to Issho (Animation International) (2000)
Pound Puppies (Young Future) (1999)
Whistle! (Animation International)
Ultraforce (Tele–Pictures Promoters International)
Masha and the Bear (Animation International) (2015–present)
Masha's Tales (Animation International) (2016–2017)
Titeuf (Fouad Antoun Productions (former), Cartoon Star (current)) (2003)
Blazing Teens (Cartoon Star) (seasons 1, 2 and 5 only)
Strange Dawn (Animation International) (2003)
Sheep in the Big City (Young Future Entertainment) (2007)
Samurai 7 (Cartoon Star) (2007)
The Adventures of Sam & Max: Freelance Police (Eastern Vision S.A.) (2006)
All-New Dennis the Menace (Tele Pictures Promoters International) (1996)
Double Dragon (Tele–Pictures Promoters International (season 1) (1996) → Tele Pictures Promoters International (season 2) (1996-1997)
Rescue Heroes (Eastern Vision S.A.) (2006)
Bump in the Night (Young Future Entertainment) (2005)
Exosquad (Young Future Entertainment) (2004)
Dumb and Dumber (1997-1998?)
Beast Wars: Transformers
Beast Machines: Transformers
What-a-Mess (Cartoon Star) (DiC version only) (2006)
Action Man (1997)
Tom & Jerry Kids (Young Future) (1998)
Woody Woodpecker (Young Future) (1997)
Shin Hakkenden (Animation International) (2003)
Honō no Dōkyūji: Dodge Danpei (Animation International) (1995)
Baby & Me (Young Future Entertainment (former), Animation International (current)) (2000)
Scan2Go (Cartoon Star)
The Legend of the North Wind (Tele–Pictures Promoters International) (1997)
Mike the Knight
Mama is a 4th Grader (Animation International) (2005)
Moero!! Robocon (Animation International) (2005)
Where on Earth Is Carmen Sandiego? (Cartoon Star) (2007)
Midori no Makibaō (Cartoon Star) (2010)
Thomas & Friends (later seasons) (2015–present)
Kiteretsu Daihyakka (Animation International) (2003)
Little Charmers (redub) (Animation International) (2016–present)
ALVINNN!!! and the Chipmunks (redub) (Animation International) (2016–2018)
The Fixies (2016–2018)
Fifi and the Flowertots (first dub) (Cartoon Star) (2006)
Fushigi Yûgi (Cartoon Star) (2008)
Inuyasha (Cartoon Star) (2007)
Shinobi: Heart Under Blade (Cartoon Star)
Vexille (Cartoon Star)
Shura no Toki: Age of Chaos (Cartoon Star)
Bartok the Magnificent
Robin Hood (Animation International) (1996)
Super Yo-Yo (Animation International) (2005)
D.I.C.E. (Cartoon Star) (2006)
Dennō Bōkenki Webdiver (Animation International) (2007)
Dragon Quest: Dai no Daibōken (Animation International) (1998)
Magical Princess Minky Momo (Animation International) (1995)
Magical Princess Minky Momo Hold on to Your Dreams (Animation International)
Crush Gear Turbo (Animation International) (2005)
Idol Densetsu Eriko (Animation International) (2006)
Akakage (Animation International) (2006)
NG Knight Ramune & 40 (Animation International) (2005)
VS Knight Ramune & 40 Fire (Animation International)
Lost Universe (Animation International) (2003-2004?)
Monster Rancher (Animation International) (2003)
Shinkai no Kantai: Submarine 707 (Animation International)
Special Armored Battalion Dorvack (Cartoon Star) (2006)
Yobarete Tobidete Akubi-chan (Animation International) (2006)
Secret of Cerulean Sand (Animation International) (2006)
Golden Warrior Gold Lightan (Cartoon Star) (2006)
Groove High (Animation International) (2002–2007)
Tiger Mask II (Animation International) (1990's)
Strange Dawn (Animation International) (2003)
Hamtaro (Animation International) (2005–2011?)
Adventures from the Book of Virtues (Cartoon Star) (2006)
Höjdarna (Roofters) (Cartoon Star)
UFO Robot Grendizer (redub) (Animation International) (2015–2016)
Peacemaker Kurogane (Cartoon Star) (2007)
The Marshmallow Times (Cartoon Star)
Cookin' Idol Ai! Mai! Main! (Animation International)
Barney & Friends
The Kidsongs Television Show (Eastern Vision S.A.) (2000's)
Hero Hero-kun (Cartoon Star)
Charley and Mimmo (Animation International) (2005)
Vehicle Kingdom Boo Boo Can Kang (Animation International) (2006)
Sakura Wars (Cartoon Star)
Peanuts (Young Future) (1999)
Madeline (Young Future Entertainment) (2001-2002?), (Cartoon Star)
Wild West C.O.W.-Boys of Moo Mesa (Young Future Entertainment) (2004)
SWAT Kats: The Radical Squadron (Young Future) (1998)
Enchanted Tales (Young Future (former), Animation International (current))
Manxmouse (Syrian dub) (Young Future)
Cabbage Patch Kids
Pocoyo (Animation International) (2015–2018)
Tanken Driland (Animation International) (2015)
Heroes of the City (Season 1: Animation International, Season 2: Cartoon Star) (2014)
Virtua Fighter (Animation International) (2004)
Mia (Animation International)
Edebits (Cartoon Star) (2006)
Odin: Photon Sailer Starlight (Animation International) (1991)
Sealab 2021 (Young Future Entertainment)
Doraemon (1979 anime) (animation International) (1996-1997)
Doraemon (2005 anime) (Animation International) (2016–present)
A Troll in Central Park
The Fairly OddParents (redub) (Animation International) (2016–2017)
Ultimate Top Plate (Cartoon Star) (2015–2016)
Om Nom Stories (2016)
Shopkins (2016)
The Magic Pencil (El Lápiz Mágico) (Akkad Bros)
Super Duper Sumos (Cartoon Star) (2008)
Codename: Kids Next Door (Young Future) (2009)
Arabian Nights: Sinbad's Adventures (Animation International) (1980)
The Tales of Waterville
Flint the Time Detective
Iron Kid (Cartoon Star) (2007)
Vicky the Viking
Chiquititas (Animation International) (2001)
The Black Corsair (Animation International)
The Great Book of Nature (Animation International) (2004)
Animal Games (Animation International)
Toy Toons (Animation International) (2003)
The Toy Warrior (Cartoon Star)
The Super Dimension Fortress Macross (Cartoon Star) (2006)
Delfy and His Friends (Cooper International trading co) (1995)
Watership Down (Al Sayyar Art Prod.)
Wolverine and the X-Men
Jankenman (redub) (Animation International) (2006)
Topo Gigio (Animation International) (1995)
Yume Miru Topo Gigio (Animation International)
The Magic School Bus (first dub) (Tele–Picturs Promoters Intrnantional → Tele–Pictur Promoters Iinternatoinal) (1998-2000)
Ojamajo Doremi (Season 1: Animation International, # & Mo~tto!: Cartoon Star) (2006)
Super Mario World (Tele Pictures Promoters International) (1996)
The Secret Lives of Waldo Kitty (Tele–Pictures Promoters International)
Idaten Jump (Cartoon Star) (2008)
Clamp School Detectives (Cartoon Star) (2007)
Phantom 2040 (Tele Pictures Promoters International) (1996)
Bob the Builder (2015 series) (2016–2019)
Ben 10 (Young Future) (2008)
Visitor (Animation International)
Recess: School's Out
Simba the King Lion (animation International → Animation International) (1997-1998)
Beyblade (Animation International) (2004)
Beyblade V-Force (Animation International) (2007)
Beyblade G-Revolution (Animation International) (2008)
Beyblade: Metal Fusion (Cartoon Star) (2010–2011)
Beyblade: Metal Masters (Cartoon Star) (2011)
Beyblade: Metal Fury (Cartoon Star) (2014)
Beyblade: Shogun Steel (Cartoon Star) (2016)
Bomberman B-Daman Bakugaiden (Animation International) (2001-2002)
Bomberman B-Daman Bakugaiden V (Animation International) (2002-2003)
Burst Ball Barrage!! Super B-Daman (Animation International) (2006)
Battle B-Daman (Animation International) (2007)
Battle B-Daman: Fire Spirits! (Animation International) (2008)
Crash B-Daman (Animation International) (2010)
B-Daman Crossfire (Cartoon Star) (2014–2015)
Strawberry Shortcake (Cartoon Star) (21 episodes only) (2006)
Gormiti (Cartoon Star)
Dinofroz (Cartoon Star) (2013)
Hoshizora no Violin (Young Future)
Sugarbunnies (Animation International) (2013)
Sugarbunnies: Chocolat! (Animation International)
Sugarbunnies: Fleur (Animation International)
Anyamaru Tantei Kiruminzuu (Cartoon Star) (2013)
Bakusō Kyōdai Let's & Go!! (Animation International) (2002-2003)
Bakusō Kyōdai Let's & Go!! WGP (Animation International) (2003-2004)
Bakusō Kyōdai Let's & Go!! MAX (Animation International) (2009-2010)
Fist of the North Star (Cartoon Star) (2008) (52 episodes only)
Inspector Gadget's Field Trip (Young Future Entertainment) (2004)
Zak Tales (Young Future Entertainment)
The Legend of Snow White (Animation International) (1995)
The Story of Cinderella (Animation International) (1998)
World Masterpiece Theater
Trapp Family Story (Animation International) (1994-1995)
Tico of the Seven Seas (Animation International) (1998)
Romeo's Blue Skies (Animation International) (1998)
Remi, Nobody's Girl (Animation International) (2000)
Little Women II: Jo's Boys (redub) (Cartoon Star) (2008)
Les Misérables: Shōjo Cosette (Animation International) (2013–2014)
The Adventures of Tom Sawyer (redub) (Animation International) (2015)
Digimon Adventure (Animation International) (2001)
Digimon Adventure 02 (Animation International)  (2002)
Digimon Tamers (Fouad Antoun Productions (earlier episodes), Young Future (later episodes)) (2003)
Digimon Frontier (Young Future Entertainment) (2004)
Yo-kai Watch (2016–2018)
Enchantimals: Tales from Everwilde (2020–present)
The Mr. Men Show (redub) (2020)
Operation Ouch! (redub) (2021–present)
Secret Millionaires Club
The Smurfs (2021) (2022)
Teletubbies (2015) (episode 31 onwards) (2022)

See also 
 Spacetoon
 Animation International

References 

مركز الزهرة للإنتاج الفني Zarfin

External links 

Notes
 KM Production dubs anime but from the English dub.

1985 establishments in Syria
Anime companies
Companies based in Damascus
Companies established in 1985
Companies of Syria
Syrian dubbing studios